Richard Brandon Johnson (born January 14, 1974) is an American actor and television host. From 2011 to 2013, he starred as Gary Wilde on the Disney Channel series Shake It Up. He has also hosted the TNT reality competition series 72 Hours.

Early life and education 
Johnson was born in Bloomington, Minnesota. He graduated from Bloomington Jefferson High School in 1992 where he was part of the junior varsity hockey team. He is a graduate of the University of Wisconsin–Eau Claire.

Career
Johnson got his first big break on the small screen playing the recurring character Michael McBain on the ABC Daytime series One Life to Live in 2003, playing the role until 2004. Johnson returned to the series in 2007 and in 2008 in the recurring role of Chuck Wilson III, later also playing the character's father Chuck Wilson, Jr. in a 1968 flashback storyline. Johnson appeared in three episodes of the Disney Channel original series Hannah Montana as Brian Winters, the quirky host of a fictional series called Singing with the Stars. The role was a parody of American Idol host Ryan Seacrest. His feature film credits include The Notorious Bettie Page starring Gretchen Mol, the comedy Rick starring Bill Pullman and lead roles in the horror films Malevolence and Little Erin Merryweather, which was an official selection of the Cannes Film Festival.

Johnson has many credits as a television host. He first broke onto the scene as the host of the entertainment show Cool In Your Code, which was shot entirely on the streets of New York City and was nominated for 18 New York Emmy Awards and won 4. He was also the host of HGTV's Get Out Way Out!, My Yard Goes Disney, My House Goes Disney, RV 2013, FOX Soccer Channel's Fox Soccer USA, G4TV's Formula D and Outdoor Life Network's Rally America and USA Network's Character Fantasy and TNT's reality competition series 72 Hours. Johnson also formerly co-starred on the Disney Channel comedy series Shake It Up as Gary Wilde, the host of the fictional dance show Shake It Up, Chicago!.

Personal life
Johnson is also an accomplished drummer; he is one of the founding members of the alternative rock band Ill Rocket, as well as a member of The Progress, Pelt, Touch Is Automatic, Yellow No. 5 and The Duncan Bleak Ensemble.

Johnson married Ariel Fox, an interior designer, on May 4, 2013 at Wayfarers Chapel in Rancho Palos Verdes, California. They have one son together.

Filmography

Film

Television

References

External links
 

1974 births
Male actors from Minnesota
American male film actors
American male soap opera actors
American male television actors
American television personalities
Living people
People from Bloomington, Minnesota
University of Wisconsin–Eau Claire alumni